Vincent Wheeler Bladen,  (14 August 1900 – 26 November 1981) was a British-Canadian economist.

Upon completing his degree at Balliol College, Oxford, Bladen began teaching at University of Toronto in September 1921, where he later served as a dean of the Faculty of Arts from 1959. In 1960, he was appointed Chairman of the Royal Commission on the Automotive Industry which helped to create the Canadian-American Automotive Agreement. Bladen retired from teaching in 1969, but continued to give lectures.

Bladen was the founding editor of the Canadian Journal of Economics and Political Science. Several editions of Bladen's An Introduction to Political Economy were published during his lifetime. In 1962, he edited Canadian Population and Northern Colonization. In 1974, Bladen's book From Adam Smith to Maynard Keynes : the heritage of political economy was published. His memoirs, Bladen on Bladen, were published in 1978.

In 1976, Bladen was made an Officer of the Order of Canada, Canada's highest civilian honor. He was awarded an honorary Doctor of Laws from Carleton University in 1966 and York University in 1975.

The Vincent W. Bladen Library at the University of Toronto Scarborough is named in his honour.

References

1900 births
1981 deaths
Canadian university and college faculty deans
Officers of the Order of Canada
Academic staff of the University of Toronto
20th-century Canadian economists
Economics journal editors
Political science journal editors
Alumni of Balliol College, Oxford
English emigrants to Canada
People from Stoke-on-Trent
Political economists
Presidents of the Canadian Political Science Association
20th-century political scientists